Night in London is a 1967 Indian Hindi-language film directed by Brij. It stars Biswajeet, Mala Sinha, Johnny Walker, Helen in pivotal roles. The music was composed by Laxmikant-Pyarelal.

Plot
A woman named Renu (Mala Sinha) is forced to lead a life of crime as her dad is being held hostage by the underworld. She eventually joins with a suspected criminal Jeevan (Biswajeet), both fall in love with each other, and team up against the bad guys.

Cast
 Biswajeet as Jeevan 
 Mala Sinha as Renu 
 Johnny Walker as Bahadur Singh 
 Helen as Sue
 Anwar Hussain as Colonel Fuji
 M. B. Shetty as Shetty

Soundtrack
The music was composed by the duo Laxmikant-Pyarelal.

References

External links 
 

Films scored by Laxmikant–Pyarelal
1967 films
1960s Hindi-language films
Films set in London
Films directed by Brij Sadanah